Muhammad Mohsin (1859–1882) was a Sindhi poet, better known by his nom-de-plume Bekas. He was the son of Faqeer Bedil and the first follower of his school of thought in poetry. They are buried at the same place so the shrine is commonly known as the shrine of Bedil and Bekas.

References

1857 births
1881 deaths
Mystic poets
Sufi poets
Sufi mystics
Sufism in Sindh
Sindhi-language poets
Sindhi people
Sufis of Sindh
History of Sindh
Sindhi-language writers
People from British India
19th-century poets